Walter Wilkins (1741 – 17 March 1828), of Maesllwch, Radnorshire and Wallsworth Hall, Gloucestershire was an English Member of Parliament.

He was a younger son of attorney John Wilkins of The Priory, Brecon and was educated at Christ College, Brecon, Winchester School (1754–58) and Reeves's academy, London (1758).

He held the offices of High Sheriff of Radnorshire for 1774–75 and Breconshire for 1778–79. He served as Member of Parliament for Radnorshire from 1796 until his death in 1828 representing the Whig party.

He married Catherine, the daughter and heiress of Samuel Hayward of Wallsworth Hall; they had 1 son (Walter Wilkins) and 1 daughter.

References

External links 
 

1741 births
1828 deaths
People from Radnorshire
People educated at Winchester College
Members of the Parliament of Great Britain for Welsh constituencies
British MPs 1796–1800
Whig (British political party) MPs for Welsh constituencies
UK MPs 1801–1802
UK MPs 1802–1806
UK MPs 1806–1807
UK MPs 1807–1812
UK MPs 1812–1818
UK MPs 1818–1820
UK MPs 1820–1826
UK MPs 1826–1830
High Sheriffs of Radnorshire
High Sheriffs of Brecknockshire
People educated at Christ College, Brecon